The list of DFB-Pokal finals contains all of the finals of the DFB-Pokal since the introduction of the competition as the Tschammerpokal in 1935.

The finals of the DFB-Pokal usually take place at the end of each German football season. In some cases, like 1970 and 1974, the finals were held at the beginning of the following season due to the FIFA World Cup. The exact date has changed repeatedly over the years. Until 1984, the final was held at various venues, most often in Frankfurt, Stuttgart, Hanover, or Düsseldorf.

Since 1985, the Olympiastadion in Berlin has been the fixed venue for the finals. This will remain at least until 2020, as the DFB and the city of Berlin agreed on an extension to the contract expiring in 2015.

After the introduction of the DFB-Pokal der Frauen in 1981 until 2009, the women's final has taken place immediately before the men's final in the same stadium (since 1985 the Olympiastadion), barring the 1983 finals.

There has only been one derby in the cup final, which took place in 1983 between Cologne clubs 1. FC Köln and Fortuna Köln. The match took place in Cologne. Also, only once has the cup final required a replay, which took place in 1977. Two days' rest was given to the players after the first match ended in a 1–1 draw extra time. Eventually, the rules were changed to require a penalty shoot-out in the case of the scores remaining level after extra time. The first penalty shoot-out in a final took place in 1984.

Finals

Tschammerpokal

DFB-Pokal

Performance by club

Ranking by venue

Repeated final pairings
A total of 8 final pairings have been repeated on 11 occasions. Of these 8 final pairings, 6 have included Bayern Munich as a finalist. Two of these parings have been played more than twice. The most common final is Borussia Dortmund v Bayern Munich, having occurred on four occasions, with Werder Bremen v Bayern Munich the second-most common, having been repeated thrice. Werder Bremen v Bayern Munich is the only final pairing to have been played in consecutive seasons, occurring in 1999 and 2000. The longest gap between repeated finals is Bayern Munich v Schalke 04, occurring 36 years apart in 1969 and 2005.

Notes

References

External links
 

 
DFB-Pokal finals